4X is a genre of computer strategy games.

4X may also refer to:
 Sogitec 4X, an audio processor created at IRCAM
 4x CD-ROM drive, a speed of CD-ROM drive
 LG Optimus 4X HD, an Android smartphone
 NWFB Route 4X, a bus route in Hong Kong
4X, the production code for the 1977 Doctor Who serial Image of the Fendahl
 Quad scull or quadruple scull in rowing

See also
 XXXX (disambiguation)
 Forex, or Foreign exchange market 
 Castlemaine XXXX, an Australian beer brand
 Four-cross, a style of mountain bike racing
 Fourcross, a style of four-wheel downhill racing